Little Conestoga Creek is a  tributary of the Conestoga River in Pennsylvania.  The Landis Mill Covered Bridge crosses the creek.

The name of the creek comes from the Susquehannock Kanestoge, meaning "at the place of the immersed pole". This was the name of the principal Susquehannock settlement, now Conestoga, Pennsylvania.

Tributaries
West Branch Little Conestoga Creek
Brubaker Run

See also
List of Pennsylvania rivers

References

Tributaries of the Conestoga River
Rivers of Pennsylvania
Rivers of Lancaster County, Pennsylvania